WELL Health Technologies is a multichannel digital health technology company and Canada's largest owner and operator of outpatient health clinics. The company owns and operates primary healthcare facilities in Canada and The United States and also provides (SaaS) EMR services to clinics and doctors across Canada. Well Health Technologies is publicly traded on the Toronto Stock Exchange under the symbol WELL.TO. Hamed Shahbazi has served as the company's CEO since its foundation in 2010.

WELL Health Technologies company was established in February 2018 with the main offices based out of Vancouver, British Columbia, Canada. The company's founder and CEO is Hamed Shahbazi, previous CEO of TIO Networks, which was acquired by PayPal for $304M in 2017. The company's business activity has been mostly in the domain of telemedicine, such as teleconferencing, clinical database management, electronic medical records (EMR), cybersecurity, billing, digital apps, and more. The company mainly operates in Canada and United States.
WELL Health Technologies first went public in January 2020 on Toronto Stock Exchange. Similar to many telemedicine companies, WELL Health Technologies experienced a rapid growth during the COVID-19 Pandemic. Its shares rose from $1.80 in January 2020 to the peak of $9.20 per share in February 2021, returning to the $3.00 range by 2023.
In April 2021, the company was subject to a "short-seller attack" based on claims made by an anonymous author. Two weeks later, the same publication that published the report, issued a rebuttal of the article.

Mergers and acquisitions
WELL Health Technologies has expanded through a number of mergers and acquisitions including the US-based CRH Medical Corp (2021), and ExecHealth (2021), Intrahealth Systems among others. A number of sources reported that Well Health Technologies is set to acquire Toronto-based MyHealth Centres, which will add 48 clinics to the company's network.

See also
Telemedicine service providers
Telehealth
Electronic health record

References

Canadian companies established in 2010
Companies listed on the Toronto Stock Exchange
Health care companies established in 2010
Health information technology companies
Healthcare software companies
Software companies established in 2010
Telemedicine